Ignacy Nagurczewski (22 March 1725 – 1811) was a Polish writer, translator, educator, and Jesuit. He is known for translating Homer's Iliad and Odyssey into Polish. He was a lecturer at the prestigious Collegium Nobilium in Warsaw.

References

External links
Short Bio

Polish male writers
Polish translators
18th-century Polish Jesuits
1725 births
1811 deaths
Polish educators
18th-century translators